The Manchester Magic are an English basketball club from the city of Manchester in the northwest of England.

For the 2019-20 season, the Magic will compete in the National Basketball League Division 2 North.  They play their home games at the Manchester Basketball Centre, which was part-funded by former NBA star John Amaechi.  A sister team, the Manchester Mystics, compete in the top-tier Women's British Basketball League.

History
The Magic were first established in 1997, originally as a reserve squad for the nearby Manchester Giants, entering the newly founded NBL Division 3 for the 1997/1998 season and winning immediate promotion as league runner-up and playoff champions.  A change in direction from their one-time parent club saw the fledgling team become independent mid-way through their first season in Division Two, choosing the City of Manchester Attitude as their new name.  A first league title was to follow at the end of the 1999/2000 season, with the club joining the top flight just as the national league was being restructured, forming the short-lived NBL Conference.

After rebranding as the Manchester Magic, the club enjoyed over a decade of success in the top tier of the English Basketball League, with the highlight being a triple title success in the 2007/2008 season, claiming the National Cup alongside the league and playoff titles.  The team then took the shock decision to play in Division 3 for the 2011/12 season, in order "to forge a much closer link between the youngsters... and the men's team", in the words of club director Joe Forber.  The club worked their way back up the English leagues in record time, winning Division 3 at the first attempt to earn a return to Division 2, and then gaining back-to-back promotions with a runner-up spot in Division 2 in the 2012/13 season.

Since returning to Division 1, the Magic have claimed both the National Cup and National Trophy in the 2014/15 season, alongside second-place finishes in both the league and the end-of-season playoffs.

Club honours

National Cup
 2007, 2008, 2015, 2016
National Trophy
 2015, 2016
EBL Division 1 League Champions
 2008
EBL Division 1 Playoff Champions
 2008, 2010
EBL Division 2 League Champions
 2000
EBL Division 3 League Champions
 2012
EBL Division 3 Playoff Champions
 1998

Season-by-season records

References

External links
Official Manchester Magic website

Basketball teams in England
Sport in Manchester
Basketball teams established in 1997